José Daniel Ascanio Aparicio (born 13 May 2000) is a Colombian footballer who plays for Colombian club Real Santander.

Career
After playing with the youth teams of Real Santander, Ascanio made his senior debut in the Colombian second tier Categoría Primera B.

In January 2022, he went on loan with Valour FC of the Canadian Premier League. However, his arrival to the club was delayed due to visa issues. He made his debut on 10 July, recording an assist in a 1-0 victory over HFX Wanderers FC. After a season-ending injury, his loan was terminated in early September, so that he could return to Colombia.

References

External links

2000 births
Living people
Colombian footballers
Association football midfielders
Real Santander footballers
Valour FC players
Categoría Primera B players
Canadian Premier League players